Sphodrosomus is a genus of beetles in the family Carabidae, containing the following species:

 Sphodrosomus griseolum (Fauvel, 1882)
 Sphodrosomus monteithi Will, 2006
 Sphodrosomus saisseti Perroud & Montrouzier, 1864

References

Pterostichinae